Wu wei is an ancient Chinese concept literally meaning "inexertion", "inaction", or "effortless action". Wu wei emerged in the Spring and Autumn period, and from Confucianism, to become an important concept in Chinese statecraft and Taoism. It was most commonly used to refer to an ideal form of government, including the behavior of the emperor.  Describing a state of personal harmony, free-flowing spontaneity and savoir-faire, it generally also more properly denotes a state of spirit or mind, and in Confucianism accords with conventional morality. 

Sinologist Jean François Billeter describes wu-wei as a "state of perfect knowledge of the reality of the situation, perfect efficaciousness and the realization of a perfect economy of energy", which in practice Edward Slingerland qualifies as a "set of ('transformed') dispositions (including physical bearing)... conforming with the normative order".

Definition
Sinologist Herrlee Creel considers wu wei, as found in the Tao Te Ching and Zhuangzi, to denote two different things.

 An "attitude of genuine non-action, motivated by a lack of desire to participate in human affairs" and
 A "technique by means of which the one who practices it may gain enhanced control of human affairs".

The first is quite in line with the contemplative Taoism of the Zhuangzi. Described as a source of serenity in Taoist thought, only rarely do Taoist texts suggest that ordinary people could gain political power through wu wei.  The Zhuangzi does not seem to indicate a definitive philosophical idea, simply that the sage "does not occupy himself with the affairs of the world".

The first sense appears to have been imported from the earlier governmental thought of "legalist" Shen Buhai (400 BC – c. 337 BC) as Taoists became more interested in the exercise of power by the ruler. Called "rule by non-activity" and strongly advocated by Han Fei, during the Han dynasty, up until the reign of Han Wudi rulers confined their activity "chiefly to the appointment and dismissal of his high officials", a plainly "Legalist" practice inherited from the Qin dynasty. This "conception of the ruler's role as a supreme arbiter, who keeps the essential power firmly in his grasp" while leaving details to ministers, has a "deep influence on the theory and practice of Chinese monarchy", and played a "crucial role in the promotion of the autocratic tradition of the Chinese polity", ensuring the ruler's power and the stability of the polity.

Only appearing three times in the second (more contemplative) more than half of the Zhuangzi, early Taoists may have avoided the term for its association with "Legalism" before ultimately co-opting its governmental sense as well, as attempted in the Zhuangzi's latter half. Thought by modern scholarship to have been written after the Zhuangzi, wu wei becomes a major "guiding principle for social and political pursuit" in the more "purposive" Taoism of the Tao Te Ching, in which the Taoist "seeks to use his power to control and govern the world".

Confucian development 
Sinologist Herrlee G. Creel believed that an important clue to the development of wu wei existed in the Analects, in a saying attributed to Confucius, which reads: "The Master said, 'Was it not Shun who did nothing and yet ruled well? What did he do? He merely corrected his person ("made himself reverent" – Edward Slingerland) and took his proper position (facing south) as ruler'". The concept of a divine king whose "magic power" (virtue) "regulates everything in the land" (Creel) pervades early Chinese philosophy, particularly "in the early branches of Quietism that developed in the fourth century B.C."

Edward Slingerland argues wu wei in this sense has to be attained. But in the Confucian conception of virtue, virtue can only be attained by not consciously trying to attain it. The manifestation of Virtue is regarded as a reward by Heaven for following its will – as a power that enables them to establish this will on earth. In this, probably more original sense, wu wei may be regarded as the "skill" of "becoming a fully realized human being", a sense which it shares with Taoism. This "skill" avoids relativity through being linked to a "normative" metaphysical order, making its spontaneity "objective". By achieving a state of wu wei (and taking his proper ritual place) Shun "unifies and orders" the entire world, and finds his place in the "cosmos". Taken as a historical fact demonstrating the viable superiority of Confucianism (or Taoism, for Taoist depictions), wu wei may be understood as a strongly "realist" spiritual-religious ideal, differing from Kantian or Cartesian realism in its Chinese emphasis on practice.

The "object" of wu wei "skill-knowledge" is the Way, which is – to an extent regardless of school – "embodying" the mind to a "normative order existing independently of the minds of the practitioners". The primary example of Confucianism – Confucius at age 7 – displays "mastery of morality" spontaneously, his inclinations being in harmony with his virtue. Confucius considers training unnecessary if one is born loving the Way, as with the disciple Yan Hui. Mencius believed that men are already good, and need only realize it not by trying, but by allowing virtue to realize itself, and coming to love the Way. Training is done to learn to spontaneously love the Way. Virtue is compared with the grain seed (being domesticated) and the flow of water. On the other hand, Xun Kuang considered it possible to attain wu wei only through a long and intensive traditional training.

Taoist development 

Following the development of wu wei by Confucius, Shen Buhai, and subsequently Mencius, Zhuangzhi and Laozi turn towards an unadorned "no effort". Laozi, as opposed to carved Confucian jade, advocates a return to the primordial Mother and to become like uncarved wood. He condemns doing and grasping, urging the reader to cognitively grasp oneness (still the mind), reduce desires and the size of the state, leaving human nature untouched. In practice, wu wei is aimed at through behaviour modification; cryptically referenced meditation and more purely physical breathing techniques as in the Guanzi, which includes just taking the right posture.

Though, by still needing to make a cognitive effort, perhaps not resolving the paradox of not doing, the concentration on accomplishing wu wei through the physiological would influence later thinkers. The Dao De Jing became influential in intellectual circles around 250 BCE (1999: 26–27). Included in the 2nd century Guanzi, the likely older Neiye or Inward Training may be the oldest recovered Chinese text describing what would become Daoist breath meditation techniques and qi circulation, Harold D. Roth considering it a genuine 4th-century BCE text.

Verse 13 describes the aspects of shen "numen; numinous", attained through relaxed efforts.

Political development

Unable to find his philosopher-king, Confucius placed his hope in virtuous ministers. Apart from the Confucian ruler's "divine essence" (ling) "ensuring the fecundity of his people" and fertility of the soil, Creel notes that he was also assisted by "five servants", who "performed the active functions of government". Xun Kuang's Xunzi, a Confucian adaptation to Qin "Legalism", defines the ruler in much the same sense, saying that the ruler "need only correct his person" because the "abilities of the ruler appear in his appointment of men to office": namely, appraising virtue and causing others to perform.

More important information lay in the recovery of the fragments of administrator (aka "Legalist") Shen Buhai. Shen references Yao as using Fa (administrative method) in the selection and evaluation of men. Though not a conclusive argument against proto-Taoist influence, Shen's Taoist terms do not show evidence of Taoist usage (Confucianism also uses terms like "Tao", meaning the "Tao", or "Way" of government), lacking any metaphysical connotation. The later "Legalist" book, the Han Feizi has a commentary on the Tao Te Ching, but references Shen Buhai rather than Laozi for this usage.

Shen is attributed the dictum "The Sage ruler relies on method and does not rely on wisdom; he relies on technique, not on persuasions", and used the term wu wei to mean that the ruler, though vigilant, should not interfere with the duties of his ministers, saying "One who has the right way of government does not perform the functions of the five (aka various) officials, and yet is the master of the government".

Since the bulk of both the Tao Te Ching and the Zhuangzi appear to have been composed later, Creel argued that it may therefore be assumed that Shen influenced them, much of both appearing to be counter-arguments against "Legalist" controls. The thirteenth chapter of the Zhuangzi, "T'ien Tao", seems to follow Shen Buhai down to the detail, saying "Superiors must be without action in-order to control the world; inferiors must be active in-order to be employed in the world's business..." and to paraphrase, that foundation and principle are the responsibility of the superior, superstructure and details that of the minister, but then goes on to attack Shen's administrative details as non-essential.

Elsewhere the Zhuangzi references another "Legalist", Shen Dao, as impartial and lacking selfishness, his "great way embracing all things".

Non-action by the ruler 

Shen Buhai argued that if the government were organized and supervised relying on proper method (Fa), the ruler need do little – and must do little. Apparently paraphrasing the Analects, Shen did not consider the relationship between ruler and minister antagonistic necessarily, but still believed that the ruler's most able ministers his greatest danger, and is convinced that it is impossible to make them loyal without techniques. Sinologist Herrlee G. Creel explains: "The ruler's subjects are so numerous, and so on alert to discover his weaknesses and get the better of him, that it is hopeless for him alone as one man to try to learn their characteristics and control them by his knowledge... the ruler must refrain from taking the initiative, and from making himself conspicuous – and therefore vulnerable – by taking any overt action."

Emphasizing the use of administrative methods (Fa) in secrecy, Shen Buhai portrays the ruler as putting up a front to hide his weaknesses and dependence on his advisers. Shen therefore advises the ruler to keep his own counsel, hide his motivations, and conceal his tracks in inaction, availing himself of an appearance of stupidity and insufficiency. Shen says:

Acting through administrative method (Fa), the ruler conceals his intentions, likes and dislikes, skills and opinions. Not acting himself, he can avoid being manipulated. The ruler plays no active role in governmental functions. He should not use his talent even if he has it. Not using his own skills, he is better able to secure the services of capable functionaries. Creel argues that not getting involved in details allowed Shen's ruler to "truly rule", because it leaves him free to supervise the government without interfering, maintaining his perspective. Seeing and hearing independently, the ruler is able to make decisions independently, and is, Shen says, able to rule the world thereby.

This wu wei (or nonaction) might be said to end up the political theory of the "Legalists" , if not becoming their general term for political strategy, playing a "crucial role in the promotion of the autocratic tradition of the Chinese polity". The (qualified) non-action of the ruler ensures his power and the stability of the polity.

Non-action in statecraft 

Shen Buhai insisted that the ruler must be fully informed of the state of his realm, but couldn't afford to get caught up in details and in an ideal situation need listen to no one. Listening to his courtiers might interfere with promotions, and he does not, as Sinologist Herrlee G. Creel says, have the time to do so. The way to see and hear independently is the grouping together of particulars into categories using mechanical or operational method (Fa). On the contrary the ruler's eyes and ears will make him "deaf and blind" (unable to obtain accurate information). Seeing and hearing independently, the ruler is able to make decisions independently, and is, Shen says, able to rule the world thereby.

Despite this, Shen's method of appointment, "Ming-shih", advises a particular method for listening to petitioners in the final analyses, which would be articulated as Xing-Ming by Han Fei. In the Han Dynasty secretaries of government who had charge of the records of decisions in criminal matters were called Xing-Ming, which Sima Qian (145 or 135 – 86 BC) and Liu Xiang (77–6 BC) attributed to the doctrine of Shen Buhai (400 – c. 337 BC). Liu Xiang goes as far as to define Shen Buhai's doctrine as Xing-Ming. Rather than having to look for "good" men, ming-shih or xing-ming can seek the right man for a particular post by comparing his reputation with real conduct (xing "form" or shih "reality"), though doing so implies a total organizational knowledge of the regime.

More simply though, one can allow ministers to "name" themselves through accounts of specific cost and time frame, leaving their definition to competing ministers. Claims or utterances "bind the speaker to the realization a job (Makeham)". This was the doctrine, with subtle differences, favoured by Han Fei. Favoring exactness, it combats the tendency to promise too much. The correct articulation of Ming ("name", "speech", "title") is considered crucial to the realization of projects.

Shen resolved hair-splitting litigation through wu wei, or not getting involved, making an official's words his own responsibility. Shen Buhai says, "The ruler controls the policy, the ministers manage affairs. To speak ten times and ten times be right, to act a hundred times and a hundred times succeed – this is the business of one who serves another as minister; it is the not the way to rule." The correlation between wu wei and ming-shih likely informed the Taoist conception of the formless Tao that "gives rise to the ten thousand things."

Yin (passive mindfulness)
Adherence to the use of technique in governing requires the ruler not engage in any interference or subjective consideration. Sinologist John Makeham explains: "assessing words and deeds requires the ruler's dispassionate attention; (yin is) the skill or technique of making one's mind a tabula rasa, non-committaly taking note of all the details of a man's claims and then objectively comparing his achievements of the original claims."

A commentary to the Shiji cites a now-lost book as quoting Shen Buhai saying: "By employing (yin), 'passive mindfulness', in overseeing and keeping account of his vassals, accountability is deeply engraved." The Guanzi similarly says: "Yin is the way of non-action. Yin is neither to add to nor to detract from anything. To give something a name strictly on the basis of its form – this is the Method of yin." Yin also aimed at concealing the ruler's intentions, likes and opinions.

Shen Dao 
Shen Dao espouses an impersonal administration in much the same sense as Shen Buhai, and argued for wu wei, or the non action of the ruler, along the same lines, saying

Shen Dao eschews appointment by interview in favour of a mechanical distribution apportioning every person according to their achievement. Linking administrative methods or standards to the notion of impartial objectivity associated with universal interest, and reframing the language of the old ritual order to fit a universal, imperial and highly bureaucratized state, Shen cautions the ruler against relying on his own personal judgment, contrasting personal opinions with the merit of the objective standard as preventing personal judgements or opinions from being exercised. Personal opinions destroy standards, and Shen Dao's ruler therefore "does not show favoritism toward a single person".

Han Fei
Devoting the entirety of Chapter 14, "How to Love the Ministers", to "persuading the ruler to be ruthless to his ministers", Han Fei's enlightened ruler strikes terror into his ministers by doing nothing (wu wei). The qualities of a ruler, his "mental power, moral excellence and physical prowess" are irrelevant. He discards his private reason and morality, and shows no personal feelings. What is important is his method of government. Fa (administrative standards) require no perfection on the part of the ruler.

Han Fei's use of wu wei may have been derivative of Taoism, but its Tao emphasizes autocracy ("Tao does not identify with anything but itself, the ruler does not identify with the ministers"). Sinologists like Randall P. Peerenboom argue that Han Fei's Shu (technique) is arguably more of a "practical principle of political control" than any state of mind. Han Fei nonetheless begins by advising the ruler to remain "empty and still":

Han Fei's commentary on the Tao Te Ching asserts that perspectiveless knowledge – an absolute point of view – is possible, though the chapter may have been one of his earlier writings.

Han dynasty 
"Legalism" dominated the intellectual life of the Qin and early Han together with Taoism. Early Han dynasty Emperors like Emperor Jing (r. 157–141 BCE) would be steeped in a Taoistic laissez-faire. But Shen Buhai's book would be widely studied even from the beginning of the Han era. Jia Yi's (200–168 AD) Hsin-shu, undoubtedly influenced by the "Legalists", describes Shen Buhai's techniques as methods of applying the Tao, or virtue, bringing together Confucian and Taoist discourses under the imagery of the Zhuangzi. Many later texts, for instance in Huang-Lao, use similar images to describe the quiescent attitude of the ruler.

The Huang-Lao text Huainanzi (Western Han Dynasty 206 B.C. – 9 A.D.), arguing against Legalist centralization, would go on to include naturalist arguments in favour of rule by worthies on the basis that one needs their competence for such things as diplomacy, and defines wu wei as follows: "What is meant ... by wu-wei is that no personal prejudice [private or public will,] interferes with the universal Tao [the laws of things], and that no desires and obsessions lead the true course ... astray. Reason must guide action in order that power may be exercised according to the intrinsic properties and natural trends of things."

The Huang–Lao text Jing fa says

Modern
Philosopher Alan Watts believed that Wu Wei can best be described as "not-forcing." Watts also understood Wu Wei as “the art of getting out of one’s own way” and offered the following illustration: “The river is not pushed from behind, nor is it pulled from ahead. It falls with gravity.”

Leo Tolstoy was deeply influenced by Taoist philosophy, and wrote his own interpretation of Wu Wei in his piece Non-Activity.

Psychoanalyst Robin S. Brown has examined Wu Wei in the context of Western psychotherapy. Brown links Wu Wei with the psychoanalytic notion of enactment.

See also

Flow (psychology)
Sahaja
Samyama
Zuhd

Notes

References

Citations

General sources

External links
 "Taoism – The Wu-Wei Principle" by Ted Kardash.  Jade Dragon Online, June 1998.
 "Wei-wu-wei: Nondual action" by David Loy. Philosophy East and West, Vol. 35, No. 1 (January 1985) pp. 73–87.
 "Wu-Wei in Europe. A Study of Eurasian Economic Thought" by Christian Gerlach. London School of Economics 2005.
 "Wú wéi translations and usages in Buddhism"—Digital Dictionary of Buddhism
 Wu Wei (WuWei) Calligraphy Scrolls from the Dao de Jing
 Daoism.net—The Entire Philosophy of Laozi’s Daodejing Explained in Common Sense
 Laozi, Libertarianism & Wu-wei(Non-interference) Analysis老子的无为详解

Chinese words and phrases
Taoist philosophy
Laozi